Lurago d'Erba is a comune (municipality) in the Province of Como in the Italian region Lombardy, located about  north of Milan and about  southeast of Como.

Lurago d'Erba borders the municipalities of Alzate Brianza, Anzano del Parco, Inverigo, Lambrugo, Merone and Monguzzo.

References

External links
 Official website

Cities and towns in Lombardy